Wonder Wheel (foaled February 7, 2020) is a champion American Thoroughbred racehorse who won the 2022 Breeders' Cup Juvenile Fillies and was named the 2022 Champion Two-Year-Old Filly.

Background
Wonder Wheel is a dark bay or brown filly who was bred in Kentucky by Three Chimneys Farm and Clearsky Farms and was a $275,000 purchase at the 2021 September Keeneland sale by D. J. Stables. Her dam Wonder Gal was GI placed several times and a winner of $904,800 who died earlier in 2022. Her other foal, Road Bible, a 4-year-old son of Pioneerof the Nile is a three-time winner with earnings of $70,480.

Wonder Wheel is trained by US Hall of Fame trainer Mark E. Casse.

Statistics

Notes:

An (*) asterisk after the odds means Wonder Wheel was the post-time favourite.

Pedigree

References

2020 racehorse births
Racehorses bred in Kentucky
Racehorses trained in the United States
Thoroughbred family 12-b
American Grade 1 Stakes winners
Breeders' Cup Juvenile Fillies winners